This is a list of members of the Tasmanian House of Assembly between the 6 May 1950 election and the 19 February 1955 election.

Notes
  Liberal MHA for Darwin, Jack Chamberlain, resigned on 22 March 1951 to contest an Australian Senate seat. A recount on 2 April 1951 resulted in the election of Liberal candidate Jack Breheny.
  Independent MHA for Denison, Bill Wedd, resigned in September 1953. A recount on 24 October 1953 resulted in the election of Independent candidate Leo McPartlan.
  Liberal MHA for Bass, John Orchard, resigned on 25 March 1954 to contest the Council seat of Cornwall. A recount on 5 April 1954 resulted in the election of Liberal candidate Bill Beattie.

Sources
 
 Parliament of Tasmania (2006). The Parliament of Tasmania from 1856

Members of Tasmanian parliaments by term
20th-century Australian politicians